Lake Mystic is an unincorporated community and census-designated place in Liberty County, Florida, United States. Its population was 500 as of the 2010 census.

Geography

References

Unincorporated communities in Liberty County, Florida
Unincorporated communities in Florida
Census-designated places in Liberty County, Florida
Census-designated places in Florida